Miklós Illyés (born 12 January 1972) is a Hungarian judoka.

Achievements

References

1972 births
Living people
Hungarian male judoka
Judoka at the 2000 Summer Olympics
Olympic judoka of Hungary
Place of birth missing (living people)
21st-century Hungarian people